Fairchild House, also known as the Fairchild Residence, is a Ward Wellington Ward-designed home in Syracuse, New York.  It was listed on the National Register of Historic Places in 1997.

It is listed for its architecture.

References

Houses in Syracuse, New York
National Register of Historic Places in Syracuse, New York
Houses on the National Register of Historic Places in New York (state)
Prairie School architecture in New York (state)
Houses completed in 1914